Alessio Abibi (born 4 December 1996) is a professional footballer who plays as a goalkeeper for  club Perugia. Born in Italy, he has represented Albania at youth level.

Club career
In August 2019, he joined Serie C club Avellino.

On 31 January 2020 he moved to  Cavese.

On 10 September 2020 he joined KF Kastrioti. He left the club again two months later.

On 5 January 2021 he signed for League of Ireland Premier Division side Dundalk following the departure of both Gary Rogers (retirement) and Aaron McCarey (Cliftonville) from his new club. Abibi made his competitive debut for the club on 12 March 2021 in the 2021 President's Cup which his side won 4–3 on penalties after a 1–1 draw with Abibi preventing 3 Shamrock Rovers players from scoring in the shootout to win the trophy.

On 3 November 2022 he joined Perugia until 30 June 2024.

Honours

Club
Tirana
 Albanian Supercup: 2017
 Albanian First Division : Winner Group B
 Albanian First Division : 2017-2018

Dundalk
 President's Cup: 2021

References

External links

1996 births
People from Umbertide
Sportspeople from the Province of Perugia
Footballers from Umbria
Arbëreshë people
Living people
Association football goalkeepers
Albanian men's footballers
Albanian expatriate footballers
Italian footballers
Italian expatriate footballers
Albania youth international footballers
A.S.D. Città di Foligno 1928 players
CD Eldense footballers
KF Tirana players
U.S. Avellino 1912 players
Cavese 1919 players
KS Kastrioti players
Dundalk F.C. players
A.C. Perugia Calcio players
Serie C players
Serie D players
Segunda División B players
League of Ireland players
Kategoria Superiore players
Albanian expatriate sportspeople in Spain
Italian expatriate sportspeople in Spain
Expatriate footballers in Spain
Expatriate association footballers in the Republic of Ireland
Albanian expatriate sportspeople in Ireland
Italian expatriate sportspeople in Ireland